The Oxford School of Architecture was founded in 1927. Forming part of the Oxford City Technical School, this became the Oxford College of Technology in 1956, the Oxford Polytechnic in 1970 and Oxford Brookes University in 1992. Now called the School of Architecture in the Faculty of Technology, Design & the Environment, it is one of the largest architecture schools in the UK, with around 300 students and 70 staff. The school has become one of the most competitive architecture schools, ranking in the top 50 Architecture schools in the world in the 2015 QS World University Rankings.

History
The school was formed in 1927 when a small group of enthusiastic young architects decided that Oxford needed a school of architecture. They formed the club to promote this and asked the University of Oxford to start the school. This was declined as no funds were available. This was the time of the General Strike of 1926. So they approached the new principal of the then School of Technology, Arts and Sciences, John Henry Brookes, who agreed to found the school, named the Oxford School of Architecture. There were three students, two women and one man. One woman left after the first year to get married, but the school grew to one of the largest in the country. The department also have a society called the Doric Club founded the same year as the school itself in 1927.

The school
According to the Royal Institute of British Architects, the department is 'a thriving school, attracting high-quality students and offering innovative and diverse programmes which benefit directly from its associated research institutes/centres'.

The school operates mostly open plan studio spaces, with students from all years sharing working space. A digital studio was designed by Niall McLaughlin Architects and new studio space provided subsequently followed a similar design. The School of Architecture building was refurbished and extended by Winchester-based firm; Design Engine Architects with the scheme completing in 2012.

The school's courses are validated by the Royal Institute of British Architects.

Specialist study
Centre for Development and Emergency Practice.
CENDEP was awarded the Queen's Anniversary Prize and is well known for its programme for humanitarian practitioners, some of which are delivered in cooperation with UNITAR. CENDEP provides an academic setting for the study of cities, humanitarianism and refugees. Singer and activist Annie Lennox is patron of the Master's Course in Development and Emergency Practice.

Oxford Architecture Society
The school has a student-run society called the Oxford Architecture Society also known as 'OxArch'. It hosts a variety of guest lectures, workshops, competitions, films and socials throughout the academic year.

OSA Magazine
Launched in 2014 and published three times a year, the student-led OSA magazine offers a platform for students to publish original and edited articles and projects related to the theme of each issue. The magazine was founded by post-graduate students Rob Dutton and Lauren Kehoe. Subsequent editors include Adrian Alexandrescu (2015–2016), James Barrell (2016–2017), Sonia Tong (2016–2017), Jing Zhi Tan (2017-2018), Kate Ridgway (2017-2018), Maria Mavrikou (2017-2018) and Robert Antony Cresswell (2017-2018). The magazine is printed using the risoprint at activist printers Greenprint Oxford. The magazine is kindly supported by Robin Partington and Partners and Assael Architecture. www.osamag.co.uk

Heads of School
 * Christopher
John Stevenson (?-2003)
Mike Jenks (2003–2005)
Mark Swenarton (2005–2010)
Matt Gaskin (2010–2020)
Christina Godiksen (2021-)

Notable staff
Prof. David Greene (Archigram)
David Grindley
Prof. Rajat Gupta – Professor of Architecture and Climate Change
Prof. Nabeel Hamdi – Author, humanitarian and winner of UN Habitat’s Scroll of Honour
Andrew Holmes – Artist
Prof. Mike Jenks – Emeritus Professor, Co-founder of OISD
Prof. Paul Oliver MBE – Vernacular encyclopaedia
John Stevenson – Deputy Head of Architecture and Head of Design (Architecture)
Christopher Nash – Managing Partner of Grimshaw Architects

Notable alumni
Yasmeen Lari – First woman architect in Pakistan and advisor to UNESCO
Graham Stirk – Partner of Rogers Stirk Harbour + Partners practice of Richard Rogers
Charlie Luxton – Broadcaster/architectural designer
Dr Hugo Slim – Author and chief scholar at the Centre for Humanitarian Dialogue in Switzerland and former trustee of Oxfam

Honorary
Louis Hellman
Kevin McCloud
Chris Wilkinson 
Peter Clegg
Bill Dunster
Stuart Parker
Richard Rogers
 Doreen Laurence

References

External links
 Official website

Educational institutions established in 1927
Architecture schools in England
Oxford Brookes University
1927 establishments in England